The grey antwren (Myrmotherula menetriesii) is a species of bird in the family Thamnophilidae. It is found in Bolivia, Brazil, Colombia, Ecuador, French Guiana, Guyana, Peru, Suriname, and Venezuela.

Its natural habitat is subtropical or tropical moist lowland forests.

References

External links

Image at ADW

grey antwren
Birds of the Amazon Basin
Birds of the Guianas
grey antwren
Taxonomy articles created by Polbot